The South America Station was a formation of the Royal Navy which existed from 1808 to 1838 when it was split into the Pacific Station and the South East Coast of America Station.

Following the invasion of Portugal by Napoleon, the Portuguese court escaped to Brazil with an escort
of the Royal Navy under the command of Admiral Sidney Smith. Following the establishment of the Portuguese Court in Rio de Janeiro in early 1808, was shortly followed by the reinforcement of Smith's escort and the establishment of the Brazil or South America Station.

The Commander-in-Chief heading the formation played a diplomatic role in South America in the early nineteenth century as the British diplomatic service was limited to having a representative in Brazil.

Commanders-in-Chief

References

 

Commands of the Royal Navy
Military units and formations disestablished in 1838